Three Mile or Threemile may refer to:

Communities
Three Mile, North Carolina
Three Mile, West Virginia
Three Mile, Port Moresby, Papua New Guinea
Three Mile, Lae, Papua New Guinea

Bodies of water
Three Mile Bay, New York
Threemile Creek (disambiguation)
Three Mile Lake
Three Mile River

See also
Three Mile Island (disambiguation)
Three-mile limit